Comair Limited was an airline based in South Africa that operated scheduled services on domestic routes as a British Airways franchisee (and an affiliate member of the Oneworld airline alliance). It also operated as a low-cost carrier under its own kulula.com brand. Its main base was OR Tambo International Airport, Johannesburg, while focus cities were Cape Town, flying from Cape Town International Airport and Durban, King Shaka International Airport. Its headquarters were near OR Tambo in the Bonaero Park area of Kempton Park, Ekurhuleni, Gauteng.

History 

The idea for the airline came out of discussion of two second world war pilots based in Egypt, J.M.S. Martin and A.L. Zoubert, they gained another partner Leon Zimmerman and Commercial Air Services was formed in 1943 on their return to South Africa. The company began charter operations on 15 June 1946 using Fairchild F-24 Argus and Douglas DC-3 aircraft. Scheduled services between Rand Airport, Johannesburg and Durban began on 1 July 1948, using a Cessna 195.

In 1978, Donald (Dave) Novick negotiated a management buyout of Comair's aviation assets. A lengthy legal battle ensued between Novick and the Pickard Group.  On 5 June 1978, Justice George Colman rendered a 291-page document in favour of Novick. In doing so, Colman established 12 precedents in South African corporate law; the litigation is now considered to be a landmark case.

When Novick joined Comair in 1961, the company had some 50 employees and operated two Douglas DC-3 aircraft.  Under his direction, the company expanded its fleet into jet aircraft after the de-regulation of South African airline routes in 1991.

Novick pioneered a strong relationship with British Airways plc and a partnership through a franchise arrangement. British Airways later took a shareholding in Comair..

In 2001 kulula.com was established, by co-founders Gidon Novick and Erik Venter, as the first low-cost airline in South Africa. The airline maintained its lead in this segment of the market, serving leisure business customers. As part of a R 3.5-billion investment in fleet upgrade, Comair ordered eight Boeing 737-800s to update its fleet in 2013.

In March 2014, Comair announced a R 9-billion order for eight Boeing 737 MAX. The aircraft were due to be delivered from 2019 to 2022.

The government of the British Overseas Territories Saint Helena and the United Kingdom's Department for International Development (DFID) announced in March 2015 that it had reached agreement with Comair for the provision of weekly air services from Johannesburg, to commence in 2016, when the Atlantic island's airport opens for revenue service.

In August 2016, Imperial Air Cargo, a cargo airline in which Comair owned a 30 percent stake, started operations.

The company entered into voluntary business rescue proceedings on 5 May 2020, due to the impact of the coronavirus pandemic Operations were suspended on 31 May 2022. On 9 June 2022 the business rescue practitioners announced that there was no reasonable prospect of rescue and that the company be placed into liquidation.

Corporate affairs

Ownership and structure
Comair Limited was a public company listed on the Johannesburg Stock Exchange (JSE: COM), but after going into business rescue on 5 May 2020, the company was delisted from the Johannesburg Stock Exchange on 7 April 2021; this gave it access to ZAR100 million rand (USD6.8 million) under the COVID-19 Loan Guarantee Scheme put in place between the South African Reserve Bank and large commercial banks.

The group had a number of subsidiary activities, including Comair Catering Proprietary Limited, trading under the Food Directions brand, that provided on-board catering and retail services to the group’s flights, and health and other food products to South African retailers, and also had a 56% shareholding in The Highly Nutritious Food Company Proprietary Limited, trading as Eatrite, that distributes its products to retailers in South Africa.

Business trends
The published key trends for the Comair group (which includes activities under the British Airways and kulula.com brands) are shown below, as at years ending 30 June.

Comair entered into voluntary business rescue proceedings on 5 May 2020, due to the impact of the coronavirus pandemic, and no annual accounts for the fiscal year ending 30 June 2020 have therefore been published.  The figures for 2020 shown below are from the Management Accounts set out in the Business Rescue Plan:

Headquarters
The Group’s headquarters were based at 1 Marignane Drive, Bonaero Park, Kempton Park.

Destinations

British Airways franchisee

Comair offered flights to and from the following destinations, operating under the British Airways brand:

Mauritius
Port Louis – Sir Seewoosagur Ramgoolam International Airport

Namibia
Windhoek – Hosea Kutako International Airport

South Africa
Cape Town – Cape Town International Airport focus city
Durban – King Shaka International Airport focus city
Gqeberha – Chief Dawid Stuurman International Airport
East London - King Phalo Airport
Johannesburg – OR Tambo International Airport Hub

Zambia
Livingstone – Livingstone Airport

Zimbabwe
Harare – Harare International Airport
Victoria Falls – Victoria Falls Airport

kulula.com
Comair offered flights to and from the following destinations, operating under the kulula.com brand:

South Africa
Cape Town – Cape Town International Airport focus city
Durban – King Shaka International Airport focus city
George – George Airport
Johannesburg – Lanseria International Airport
Johannesburg – O. R. Tambo International Airport Hub

Codeshares
Comair codeshared with the following airlines:
 Air France
 Cathay Pacific
 Etihad Airways
 Kenya Airways
 KLM
 Qatar Airways

Fleet 
, Comair fleet included the following aircraft operated as British Airways franchise:

Incidents and accidents 
 On 12 October 1982, Douglas C-47A ZS-EJK was written off when it crashed into a mountain near Graskop in the Eastern Transvaal,  from Hoedspruit when attempting to divert to that airport. The weather was instrument meteorological conditions. All 30 people on board survived.
On 1 March 1988, Comair Flight 206, an Embraer 110 Bandeirante, crashed in Johannesburg, killing all 17 occupants. One source suggests that this incident was caused by an explosive device, carried by a passenger employed as a mineworker who had recently taken out a substantial insurance policy.
On 26 October 2015, Comair Flight BA6234 (ZS-OAA), a Boeing 737-400 operated by Comair on behalf of British Airways, crashed and was damaged beyond repair at OR Tambo International Airport. The crash was suspected to be caused by an early flare and fast touch down causing the left landing gear to collapse. No persons on board were killed or injured

See also
 Airlines of Africa

References

Further reading 
 Van Dyke, Capt Donald L. 'Fortune Favours the Bold: An African Aviation Odyssey. Philadelphia: Xlibris, 2008. .

External links 

Defunct airlines of South Africa
Airlines established in 1946
Airlines disestablished in 2022
Companies based in Ekurhuleni
Kempton Park, Gauteng
Former Oneworld affiliate members
1946 establishments in South Africa
2022 disestablishments in South Africa
South African brands
HNA Group
British Airways